Persian green is a color used in pottery and Persian carpets in Iran. It is also utilized in the architecture of religious places. 

Other colors associated with Persia include Persian pink, Persian rose, Persian orange, Persian red and Persian blue.

It is a popular color in Iran because the color green symbolizes gardens, nature, heaven, and sanctity. The first recorded use of Persian green as a color name in English was in 1891, due to Persian traditional architecture.

References

External links
Color Codes

Persian green